Grip: Combat Racing, often shortened to Grip, is a racing video game developed by Canadian studio, Caged Element and published by Wired Productions for Microsoft Windows, PlayStation 4, Xbox One, and Nintendo Switch. Warp Digital ported the title to console, and it was released for all four platforms on November 6, 2018.

Grip is the spiritual successor to Rollcage, according to Rock, Paper, Shotgun.

Gameplay 
Grip: Combat Racing is an arcade racing game in which the player controls a double-sided vehicle capable of driving on its top and bottom. Players can use weapons and powerups to combat opponents as they travel at high speeds around various tracks. When racing, racers are capable of driving on walls and ceilings of the track, given they have enough speed.

Included in the game is a single-player campaign, online multiplayer, and a 4-player split-screen mode (limited to 2-player split-screen on the Nintendo Switch).

Game Modes 
The game features 5 race modes and 2 additional modes:

 Race
 Classic Race - The main race mode, featuring powerups, where the first racer to cross the finish line wins.
 Ultimate Race - A mode in which points are scored based on attacking opponents with weapons.
 Elimination Race - A race mode in which the racer in last place is eliminated every 30 seconds.
 Speed Demon  - A race mode with powerups and weapons disabled.
 Time Trial - A mode in which a single player attempts to earn the fastest time on a given track.
 Arena - A mode set on unique arena tracks with the goal of destroying opponents.
 Carkour - A single-player mode set on unique obstacle-course style tracks, with the goal of reaching the finish line.

Planets 
Grip: Combat Racing features tracks set on 4 fictional planets, including:

 Liddo 5 - A planet covered in alien flora and abandoned research facilities.
 Jahtra - A dusty red planet littered with rocks and cliffs.
 Norvos - A snowy planet once used as a military installation.
 Orbital Prime - An industrial metropolitan planet covered in man-made infrastructure.

Development 
It raised  before Caged Element took the Kickstarter down, but not without announcing that the game would be pushed into Early Access.

Reception

According to review aggregator Metacritic, Grip received "mixed or average reviews".

References

External links
 

2018 video games
Racing video games
Windows games
PlayStation 4 games
Nintendo Switch games
Xbox One games
Video games developed in Canada
Video games set on fictional planets
Unreal Engine games
Multiplayer and single-player video games
Indie video games
Wired Productions games